In Greek mythology, Haero or Aëro (Ancient Greek: Αἱρὼ means 'to take up, raise, lift up') was a Chian princess as the daughter of King Oenopion and the nymph Helice. She was also called Merope and was loved by Orion.

Mythology 
Orion, the son of Hyrieus, fell in love with Aero, and asked her father for her hand. For her sake, the giant rendered the island Chios where they lived habitable (it was formerly full of wild beasts), and he also gathered together much booty from the folk who lived there and brought it as a bridal-gift for her. Oenopion however constantly kept putting off the time of the wedding, for he hated the idea of having such a man as his daughter’s husband. Then Orion, maddened by strong drink, broke in the doors of the chamber where the girl was lying asleep, and as he was offering violence to her Oenopion attacked him and put out his eyes with a burning brand.

Notes

References 

 Bell, Robert E., Women of Classical Mythology: A Biographical Dictionary. ABC-Clio. 1991. .
 Parthenius, Love Romances translated by Sir Stephen Gaselee (1882-1943), S. Loeb Classical Library Volume 69. Cambridge, MA. Harvard University Press. 1916.  Online version at the Topos Text Project.
 Parthenius, Erotici Scriptores Graeci, Vol. 1. Rudolf Hercher. in aedibus B. G. Teubneri. Leipzig. 1858. Greek text available at the Perseus Digital Library.

Princesses in Greek mythology